Live at Topanga Corral is a 1971 live album by Canned Heat. The album is taken from a 1969 concert at the Kaleidoscope in Hollywood, California and not at the Topanga Corral as the title suggests. Canned Heat was under contract to Liberty Records at the time and Liberty did not want to do a live album, so manager Skip Taylor told Liberty that the album had been recorded in 1966 & 1967 at the Topanga Corral and released the record with Wand Records to avoid legal complications. The record has been bootlegged and reissued countless times, and is also known as Live at the Kaleidoscope.

Track listing
"Bullfrog Blues" (Canned Heat) – 7:21
"Sweet Sixteen" (Joe Josea, B.B. King) – 10:57
"I'd Rather Be the Devil" (A. Leigh – actually Elmore James, Robert Johnson) – 5:10
"Dust My Broom" (Elmore James, Robert Johnson) – 5:46
"Wish You Would" (Billy Boy Arnold) – 8:03
"When Things Go Wrong" (A. Leigh – actually Hudson Whittaker) – 9:08

Personnel
Canned Heat
Bob Hite – vocals
Alan Wilson – slide guitar, vocals, harmonica
Henry Vestine – lead guitar
Larry Taylor – bass
Fito de la Parra – drums

Production
"A Rainstory Production by Richard Moore and Michael O'Bryant" (as indicated on LP)
Skip Taylor and Canned Heat – actual Producers

Notes

References
 de la Parra, Fito (2000). Living the Blues: Canned Heat's Story of Music, Drugs, Death, Sex and Survival .

Canned Heat albums
1971 live albums
Wand Records live albums
Albums produced by Bob Hite
Albums produced by Alan Wilson (musician)
Albums produced by Henry Vestine
Albums produced by Adolfo de la Parra
Albums produced by Larry Taylor